The 2016–17 Biathlon World Cup – World Cup 7 was held in Pyeongchang, South Korea, from 2 March until 5 March 2017.

Schedule of events

Medal winners

Men

Women

Achievements

 Best performance for all time

 , 13th place in Sprint
 , 19th place in Sprint
 , 30th place in Sprint and 18th in Pursuit
 , 61st place in Sprint
 , 45th place in Pursuit
 , 17th place in Sprint
 , 50th place in Sprint

 First World Cup race

 , 99th place in Sprint
 , 64th place in Sprint

References 

2016–17 Biathlon World Cup
Biathlon World Cup
Biathlon World Cup
Sports competitions in Pyeongchang County
Biathlon competitions in South Korea
Biathlon